Wager's Action was a naval confrontation on 8 June 1708 N.S (28 May O.S.), between a British squadron under Charles Wager and the Spanish treasure fleet, as part of the War of Spanish Succession. The battle ended in a British victory over the Spanish fleet.

Background
In the spring of 1708 Charles Wager was on an expedition in the Caribbean with a squadron of four ships:
 Expedition (70 guns), Captain Henry Long
 Kingston (60 guns), Captain Simon (Timothy) Bridges
 Portland (50 guns), Captain Edward Windsor
 Vulture (28 guns), fire ship under Commander Caesar Brooks

In April the squadron took in supplies on the small island of Pequeña Barú, part of the Rosario Islands, just 30 miles away from Cartagena. Here the Spanish were aware of their presence, and the governor of Cartagena sent warnings to the Spanish fleet, which was anchored in Portobelo.

Nevertheless, the commander of the treasure fleet, José Fernández de Santillán, decided to sail from Portobelo to Cartagena on 28 May. He could not wait much longer as the hurricane season was approaching and the rest of the fleet, plus their escort under Jean Du Casse were waiting in Havana and threatened to leave without him.

The Spanish fleet was composed of fourteen merchant ships, a lightly armed hulk, and three escorting warships:
 San José (64 guns), Capitan José Fernández de Santillán
 San Joaquín (64 guns), Capitan Villanueva
 Santa Cruz (44 guns),  Capitan de la Rosa

The gold and silver was concentrated on the 3 largest vessels. The San José had 7 to 11 million pesos on board, and the San Joaquín 5 million. The Santa Cruz had the rest, only a fraction of the other two ships.

Battle
The Spanish fleet reached Isla de Barú on the evening of 7 June and anchored there.
The next day there was very little wind, and around 3 p.m. they noticed Wager's squadron approaching. The Spanish took up defensive positions, but the British knew they had to attack the largest ships, because they had the most money on board. The Kingston attacked  the San Joaquín around 5 p.m. which, after two hours of battle, escaped into the night with the help of the Concepción. The Expedition attacked the San José and approached the vessel with the clear intention of boarding the ship. Around 7 p.m., after an hour and a half of fierce fighting and with only 60 meters between the two ships, the San José suddenly blew up. The ship sank immediately, taking its precious cargo and almost the entire crew to the bottom of the sea. There were only 11 survivors out of the 600 crew and passengers on board; José Fernández de Santillán went down with his ship.

By now it was dark, but there was a full moon and Wager succeeded in finding the Santa Cruz at 2 a.m. After a brief fight, which left 14 British and 90 Spanish dead, the Santa Cruz was taken; however, she had no government treasure in her - only 13 chests of pieces of eight and 14 pigs of silver which seem to have been private property. At dawn, the British discovered the San Joaquín, and Wager ordered the Kingston and Portland to capture the ship. After a few salvos, however, the San Joaquín successfully made away towards Cartagena harbour, and the British decided against following them. The rest of the Spanish fleet also reached Cartagena safely, with the exception of the hulk Concepción which, cornered by the British, beached itself on Baru Island where the crew set the ship alight.

Aftermath

The British had bested the three galleons and prevented the Spanish fleet from transporting the gold and silver to Europe and funding the Franco-Spanish war effort. Although Charles Wager became a rich man, he was disappointed with the treasure captured because it could have been many times larger if they had captured the San Joaquín. Captains Bridges and Windsor were court-martialled for this failure.

Legacy

The estimated $1bn (£662m) treasure of the San José, which is still on the bottom of the ocean but located in 2015, is estimated to be worth about 4 billion US dollars based on the speculation that it likely had 7 million Spanish pesos in registered gold on board at the time of its sinking, similar to its surviving sister ship, the San Joaquín.  The San José is called the "Holy Grail of Shipwrecks."

A group of investors from the United States called Glocca Mora Co. operating under the name "Sea Search Armada" (SSA) claim to have found the ship off the coast of Colombia in 1981, but Colombia refused to sign a 65%/35% share offer and refused SSA permission to conduct full salvage operations at the shipwreck site.  The Colombian parliament then passed a law giving the state the right to all of the treasure, leaving SSA with a 5% finder's fee, which was to be taxed at 45%. SSA sued Colombia in its own courts in 1989. The legal dispute over the rights to the treasure took a turn in July 2007 when the Supreme Court of Colombia concluded that any treasure recovered would be split equally between the Colombian government and the explorers. Sea Search Armada subsequently sued in US courts, but that case was dismissed twice, in 2011 and 2015 on technical grounds, and the US court declared the galleon property of the Colombian state. The Colombian government has not verified its existence at the stated coordinates.

On 27 November 2015, the galleon San José was found by the Colombian Navy, although the discovery was not announced by the President of Colombia, Juan Manuel Santos, until 5 December.  The discovery was made using a REMUS 6000 autonomous underwater vehicle. The identity of the shipwreck is in no doubt. From the dive photographs, Colombian marine archaeologists have identified the San José by her unique bronze cannons engraved with dolphins. Colombia has claimed the galleon as part of its submerged patrimony and has classified the information regarding the location of the galleon as a state secret.

References

External links
 Description of the action off Cartagena by Captain Charles Wager and Captain Arauz of the Spanish escort ship, Carmen. Royal Geographical Society of South Australia
 San José 1708
 El Galeón San José y la batalla de Barú (Spanish)

Conflicts in 1708
Naval battles of the War of the Spanish Succession
Naval battles involving Great Britain
Naval battles involving Spain
Cartagena, Colombia
18th century in Colombia